Diphylleia cymosa, the umbrella leaf, is an ornamental plant of the family Berberidaceae, which is native of United States. It is endemic to the deciduous forests of the southeast United States and blooms in the late spring.

References

External links

NC State University-Diphylleia cymosa
efloras-Diphylleia cymosa

Berberidaceae
Endemic flora of the United States
Flora of the Southeastern United States
Flora of the Appalachian Mountains
Taxa named by André Michaux